2-Mercaptobenzothiazole is an organosulfur compound with the formula . A white solid, it is used in the sulfur vulcanization of rubber.

Structure
The molecule is planar with a C=S double bond, so the name mercaptobenzothiazole is a misnomer.  It is not a thiol, but instead is a thioamide, in the solid state, gas-phase, and in solution. A more appropriate name is benzothiazoline-2-thione.  Solution measurements by NMR spectroscopy reveal no evidence for the thiol tautomer.  Theory also indicates that the thiol tautomer is about 39 kJ/mol higher in energy than the thioamide.

Synthesis
The compound has been produced by many methods. The industrial route entails the high temperature reaction of aniline and carbon disulfide in the presence of sulfur, which proceeds by this idealized equation:

The traditional route is the reaction of 2-aminothiophenol and carbon disulfide:

This method was developed by the discoverer of the compound, A. W. Hoffmann.  Other routes developed by Hoffmann include the reactions of carbon disulfide with 2-aminophenol and of sodium hydrosulfide with chlorobenzothiazole.  Further synthetic advances were reported in the 1920s that included demonstration that phenyldithiocarbamates pyrolyze to benzothiazole derivative.

Reactions
The compound is insoluble in water but dissolves upon the addition of base, reflecting deprotonation.
Treatment with Raney nickel results in monodesulfurization, giving benzothiazole:

The benzo ring undergoes electrophilic aromatic substitution at the position para to nitrogen.

Oxidation gives mercaptobenzothiazole disulfide. This disulfide reacts with amines to give sulfenamide derivatives such 2-morpholinodithiobenzothiazole. These compounds are used in sulphur vulcanization, where they act as accelerators.

Uses
Using 2-mercaptobenzothiazole, rubber vulcanizes with less sulfur and at milder temperatures, both factors give a stronger product.  This effect was reported by workers at Pirelli and at Goodyear Tire & Rubber.

In polymerization, it finds use as a radical polymerization inhibitor, chain transfer agent, reforming agent, and additive for photoinitiators.

The compound has also been used in the past in the gold-mining industry for the froth flotation of gold from ore residue as part of the extraction process.

Sodium salt is used as a biocide and preservative in adhesives (especially based on latex, starch, casein, and animal glues), paper, textiles. Often found together with sodium dimethyldithiocarbamate as e.g. Vancide 51. Zinc salt is used as a secondary accelerator in latex foam vulcanization.

It can be added to oil-based hydraulic fluids, heat-transfer fluids (oils, antifreezes), cutting fluids and other mixtures as a corrosion inhibitor, effective for copper and copper alloys.

It is also used in veterinary dermatology.

In electroplating it is used as a brightener for copper sulfate baths, at about 50-100 milligrams/liter. Also can be added to silver cyanide baths.

Safety
Mercaptobenzothiazole has a low toxicity in mice, with LD50 of >960 mg/kg.

Studies have identified it as a potential human carcinogen. In 2016, it was identified by the World Health Organization as probably carcinogenic to humans.

It causes allergic contact dermatitis. The derivative morpholinylmercaptobenzothiazole is a reported allergen in protective gloves, including latex, nitrile, and neoprene gloves.

It becomes air-borne as a result of wear on car tires, and is able to be inhaled.

References 

Benzothiazoles
Rubber
Dithiocarbamates
Veterinary drugs